The Women's skeet event at the 2016 Olympic Games took place on 12 August 2016 at the National Shooting Center.

Competition format
The event consisted of three rounds: a qualifier, semifinal and a final. In the qualifier, each shooter fired 3 sets of 25 shots in the set order of skeet shooting.

The top 6 shooters in the qualifying round moved on to the semifinal round. There, they fired one additional round of 16. Ties are broken using a shoot-off; additional shots are fired one at a time until there is no longer a tie.

Records
Prior to this competition, the existing world and Olympic records were as follows.

Results

Qualification round

Semifinal

Final (medal matches)

References

Shooting at the 2016 Summer Olympics
Olym
Women's events at the 2016 Summer Olympics